Viktoriya Lenyshyn (born , in Lviv) is a Ukrainian group rhythmic gymnast. She represents her nation at international competitions.

She participated at the 2012 Summer Olympics in London.
She also competed at world championships, including at the 2010 and 2011 World Rhythmic Gymnastics Championships.

References

External links

>

1991 births
Living people
Ukrainian rhythmic gymnasts
Gymnasts at the 2012 Summer Olympics
Olympic gymnasts of Ukraine

Sportspeople from Lviv
21st-century Ukrainian women